Ponzio is a surname. Notable people with this surname include:

 Augusto Ponzio (born 1942), Italian semiologist and philosopher
 Ben Ponzio (born 1975), American poker player
 Facundo Ponzio (born 1995), Argentinian footballer
 Flaminio Ponzio (1560–1613), Italian architect
 Jean-Michel Ponzio (born 1967), French illustrator
 Leonardo Ponzio (born 1982), Argentinian footballer
 Melissa Ponzio (born 1972), American actress
 Pietro Pontio (1532–1596), Italian composer